Island Records may refer to the following music industry record labels:
Island Records founded in Jamaica in 1959, and its subsidiary labels:
Island Records Australia
Island Masters 
Island Reggae Greats
Island Blue Records
The Island Def Jam Music Group, the name of the Island Records group after its merger with Def Jam Music

See also
Island (disambiguation)
List of former Island Records artists